The 1972–73 Duke Blue Devils men's basketball team represented Duke University in the 1972–73 NCAA Division I men's basketball season. The head coach was Bucky Waters and the team finished the season with an overall record of 12–14 and did not qualify for the NCAA tournament.

Schedule

References 

Duke Blue Devils men's basketball seasons
Duke
1972 in sports in North Carolina
1973 in sports in North Carolina